Toguz-Bulak is a village in Batken Region of Kyrgyzstan. It is part of the Leylek District. Its population was 1,209 in 2021.

Nearby towns and villages include Vostochny (6 miles) and Isfana (12 miles).

References

Populated places in Batken Region